Lawrence was a historic home located near Seaford, Sussex County, Delaware. It was built about 1840, as a three-story, three bay, frame structure with a gable roof. It has a rear service wing. It featured a front portico supported by four square columns.  Original details, including hardware, flooring, trim, and landscaping, survived throughout the house and grounds.

It was added to the National Register of Historic Places in 1978. It is listed on the Delaware Cultural and Historic Resources GIS system as destroyed.

References

Houses on the National Register of Historic Places in Delaware
Houses completed in 1840
Houses in Sussex County, Delaware
Seaford, Delaware
National Register of Historic Places in Sussex County, Delaware